Squid Game is a South Korean survival drama television series created by Hwang Dong-hyuk for Netflix. Its cast includes Lee Jung-jae, Park Hae-soo, Wi Ha-joon, HoYeon Jung, O Yeong-su, Heo Sung-tae, Anupam Tripathi, and Kim Joo-ryoung.

The title of the series draws from a similarly named Korean children's game. Hwang had conceived of the idea based on his own economic struggles early in life, as well as the class disparity in South Korea and capitalism. Though he had initially written it in 2009, he was unable to find a production company to fund the idea until Netflix took an interest around 2019 as part of their drive to expand their foreign programming offerings.

Squid Game was released worldwide on September 17, 2021, to critical acclaim and international attention. It is Netflix's most-watched series, becoming the top-viewed program in 94 countries and attracting more than 142 million member households and amassing 1.65 billion viewing hours during its first four weeks from launch, surpassing Bridgerton for the title of most watched show. The series has also received numerous accolades, including the Golden Globe Award for Best Supporting Actor – Series, Miniseries or Television Film for O Yeong-su and the Screen Actors Guild Award for Outstanding Performance by a Male Actor in a Drama Series and Outstanding Performance by a Female Actor in a Drama Series for Lee Jung-jae and HoYeon Jung, respectively, with all three making history as the first Korean actors to win in those categories. The first series received fourteen Primetime Emmy Award nominations, including for Best Drama, making it the first non-English language work to be nominated in this category; Jung-jae won the Outstanding Lead Actor in a Drama series, making the first time an Asian actor had won this award for a non-English work.

In June 2022, the series was renewed for a second season, which is slated to be broadcast by late 2023 or early 2024. Netflix is also developing a reality competition program based on Squid Game, featuring 456 players competing for a large cash prize.

Overview
Seong Gi-hun, a divorced father and indebted gambler who lives with his elderly mother, is invited to play a series of children's games for a chance at a large cash prize. Accepting the offer, he is taken to an unknown location where he finds himself among 455 other players who are all in deep financial trouble. The players are made to wear green tracksuits and are kept under watch at all times by masked guards in pink jumpsuits, with the games overseen by the Front Man, who wears a black mask and black uniform. The players soon discover that losing a game results in their death, with each death adding  to the potential  grand prize. Gi-hun allies with other players, including his childhood friend Cho Sang-woo and North Korean defector Kang Sae-byeok, to try to survive the physical and psychological twists of the games.

Cast and characters

Main cast

Numbers in parentheses denote the character's assigned player number in the Squid Game universe.
 Lee Jung-jae as Seong Gi-hun (성기훈, 456), a divorced chauffeur and gambling addict. He lives with his mother and struggles to support his daughter financially. He participates in the game to settle his many debts, and to prove himself financially stable enough to have custody of his daughter, who is to leave for the United States with her mother and stepfather.
 Park Hae-soo as Cho Sang-woo (조상우, 218), the former head of an investment team at a securities company. He was a junior classmate to Gi-hun, and studied at Seoul National University. He joins the game to escape the police, who wants him for stealing money from his clients and racking up massive debts from bad investments.
 Wi Ha-joon as Hwang Jun-ho (황준호), a police officer who sneaks into the game, disguised as a guard to find his missing brother.
 Jung Ho-yeon as Kang Sae-byeok (강새벽, 067), a North Korean defector. She enters the game to pay for a broker who can rescue her parents across the border, and buy a house for her reunited family to live in.
 O Yeong-su as Oh Il-nam (오일남, 001), an elderly man with a brain tumor who prefers playing the game as opposed to waiting to die in the outside world.
 Heo Sung-tae as Jang Deok-su (장덕수, 101), a gangster who enters the game to settle his massive gambling debts, including money he stole from his boss and underlings.
 Anupam Tripathi as Ali Abdul (알리 압둘, 199), a migrant worker from Pakistan, who enters the game to provide for his young family after his boss withholds his wages for months.
 Kim Joo-ryoung as Han Mi-nyeo (한미녀, 212), a loud and manipulative woman. Her reasons for entering the game are left unexplained.

Recurring cast
 Yoo Sung-joo as Byeong-gi (병기, 111), a doctor who secretly works with a group of corrupt guards to traffic the organs of dead participants in exchange for information on upcoming games
 Lee Yoo-mi as Ji-yeong (지영, 240), a young woman who has just been released from prison after killing her abusive step-father
 Kim Si-hyun as Player 244, a pastor who rediscovers his faith during the game
 Lee Sang-hee as Do Jung-soo (도정수, 017), a former glassmaker
 Kim Yun-tae as Player 069, a player who joins the game with his wife, Player 070
 Lee Ji-ha as Player 070, a player who joins the game with her husband, Player 069
 Kwak Ja-hyoung as Player 278, a player who joins Deok-su's group and acts as his henchman
 Christian Lagahit as Player 276, a player who joins Seong Gi-hun's group in the Tug of War round
 Kim Young-ok as Oh Mal-soon, Gi-hun's mother
 Cho Ah-in as Seong Ga-yeong, Gi-hun's daughter
 Kang Mal-geum as Kang Eun-ji, Gi-hun's ex-wife and Ga-yeong's mother
 Park Hye-jin as Sang-woo's mother
 Park Si-wan as Kang Cheol, Sae-byeok's younger brother

Guest cast
 Gong Yoo as a salesman who recruits participants for the Game
 Lee Byung-hun as Hwang In-ho, The Front Man, overseer of the Squid Game
 Lee Jung-jun as Guard
 John D Michaels as VIP #1
 Daniel C Kennedy as VIP #2
 David Lee as VIP #3
 Geoffrey Giuliano as VIP #4
 Stephane Mot as VIP #5
 Michael Davis as VIP #6

Episodes
Squid Game consists of one season with nine episodes at a run time of 32 to 63 minutes. All nine episodes were written and directed by Hwang. The full series was released in all Netflix worldwide markets on September 17, 2021.

Production

Development

Around 2008, Hwang Dong-hyuk had tried unsuccessfully to get investment for a different movie script that he had written, and he, his mother, and his grandmother had to take out loans to stay afloat, but still struggled amid the debt crisis within the country. He spent his free time in a Manhwabang (South Korean manga cafe) reading Japanese survival manga such as Battle Royale, Liar Game and Gambling Apocalypse: Kaiji. Hwang compared the characters' situation in these works to his own current situation and considered the idea of being able to join such a survival game to win money to get him out of debt, leading him to write a film script on that concept throughout 2009.  Hwang stated, "I wanted to write a story that was an allegory or fable about modern capitalist society, something that depicts an extreme competition, somewhat like the extreme competition of life. But I wanted it to use the kind of characters we've all met in real life." Hwang feared the storyline was "too difficult to understand and bizarre" at the time. Hwang tried to sell his story to various Korean production groups and actors, but had been told it was too grotesque and unrealistic. Hwang put this script aside without any takers, and over the next ten years successfully completed three other films, including the crime drama film Silenced (2011) and the historical drama film The Fortress (2017).

In the 2010s, Netflix had seen a large growth in viewership outside of North America, and started investing in productions in other regions, including Korea. Ted Sarandos, co-CEO of Netflix, stated in 2018 that they were looking for more successes from overseas productions: "The exciting thing for me would be if the next Stranger Things came from outside America. Right now, historically, nothing of that scale has ever come from anywhere but Hollywood." Netflix had opened up a division in Asia in 2018, and while they were still operating out of temporary leased office space in Seoul, Hwang brought his script to their attention. Kim Minyoung, one of Netflix's content officers for the Asian regions, recognized Hwang's talent from The Fortress and his other films, and upon seeing his script for Squid Game, knew they needed it for the service. Kim said "[W]e were looking for shows that were different from what's traditionally 'made it,' and Squid Game was exactly it". Netflix formally announced in September 2019 they would produce Hwang's work as an original series. Netflix's Bela Bajaria, head of global television operations, said that of their interest in Hwang's work, "we knew it was going to be big in Korea because it had a well-regarded director with a bold vision", and that "K-Dramas also travel well across Asia". Regarding his return to the project, Hwang commented, "It's a sad story. But the reason why I returned to the project is because the world 10 years from then has transformed to a place where these unbelievable survival stories are so fitting, and I found that this is the time when people will call these stories intriguing and realistic." Hwang further believed that the ongoing COVID-19 pandemic impacted the economic disparity between classes in South Korea, and said that "All of these points made the story very realistic for people compared to a decade ago".

With the Netflix order, the film concept was expanded out to a nine-episode series. Kim stated that there was "so much more than what was written in the 120-minute format. So we worked together to turn it into a series." Hwang said he was able to expand the script so that it "could focus on the relationships between people [and] the stories that each of the people had". Initially, Netflix had named the series Round Six, rather than Squid Game as Hwang had suggested; according to Netflix's vice president for content in Asia Kim Minyoung, while they knew that the name "squid game" would be familiar to Korean viewers from the children's game, it "wouldn't resonate because not many people would get it", and opted to use Round Six as it self-described the nature of the competition. As production continued, Hwang pushed on the service to use Squid Game instead, which Kim said its cryptic name and the unique visuals helped to draw in curious viewers. At the time that Hwang wrote the series, his goal was for having the series reach the most-watched show in Netflix in the United States for at least one day. Hwang had initially written the series as eight episodes, which was comparable to other Netflix shows, but found that the material for the last episode was longer than he planned, so it was split into two.

Writing
Hwang described the work as "a story about losers". The names of the characters - Seong Gi-hun, Cho Sang-woo, and Il-nam - were all based on Hwang's childhood friends, as well as the character name Hwang Jun-ho, who was also a childhood friend in real life with an older brother named Hwang In-ho. The two main characters Gi-hun and Sang-woo were based on Hwang's own personal experiences and represented "two sides" of himself; Gi-hun shared the same aspects of being raised by an economically disadvantaged single mother in the Ssangmun district of Seoul, while Sang-woo reflected on Hwang having attended Seoul National University with high expectations from his family and neighborhood. Further, Gi-hun's background was inspired by the organizers of the SsangYong Motor  against mass layoffs.

Hwang based the narrative on Korean games of his childhood to show the irony of a childhood game where competition was not important becoming an extreme competition with people's lives at stake. Additionally, as his initial script was intended for film, he opted to use children's games with simple rules that were easy to explain in contrast to other survival-type films using games with complex rules. The central game he selected, the squid game, was a popular Korean children's game from the 1970s and 1980s. Hwang recalled the squid game as "the most physically aggressive childhood game I played in neighborhood alleys as a kid, which is why I also loved it the most", and because of this "it's the most symbolic game that reflects today's competitive society, so I picked it out as the show's title". The colors of the ddakjis in the initial game,which are blue and red, were inspired from the Korean urban legend "blue paper, red paper". The "Red light, Green light" game was selected because of its potential to make a lot of losers in one go. Regarding the selection, Hwang said, "The game was selected because the scene filled with so many people randomly moving and stopping could be viewed as a ridiculous but a sad group dance." Hwang joked that the dalgona candy game they chose may influence sales of dalgona, similar to how sales of Korean gats (traditional hats) bloomed after 
the broadcast of Netflix's series Kingdom. Licking the candy to free the shape was something that Hwang said that he had done as a child and brought it into the script. Hwang had considered other Korean children's games such as Gonggi, Dong, Dong, Dongdaemun, and Why did you come to my house? (우리 집에 왜 왔니?, a Korean variant of the Hana Ichi Monme).

Hwang wrote all of the series himself, taking nearly six months to write the first two episodes alone, after which he turned to friends to get input on moving forward. Hwang also addressed the challenges of preparing for the show which was physically and mentally exhausting, saying that he had forgone dental health while making Season 1 and had to have six teeth pulled by his dentist after production was complete. As such, Hwang was initially unsure about a sequel after completing these episodes, though he wrote the ending to keep a potential hook for a sequel in mind. Hwang had considered an alternate ending where Gi-hun would have boarded the plane after concluding his call with the game organizers to see his daughter, but Hwang said of that ending, "Is that the right way for us to really propose the question or the message that we wanted to convey through the series?"

Casting

Hwang said he chose to cast Lee Jung-jae as Gi-hun as to "destroy his charismatic image portrayed in his previous roles". HoYeon Jung was requested by her new management company to send a video to audition for the series while she was finishing a shoot in Mexico and preparing for New York Fashion Week. Although this was her first audition as an actor and her expectations were low, Hwang said, "The moment I saw her audition tape from New York, I immediately thought to myself, 'this is the girl we want.' My first impression of her was that she is wild and free like an untamed horse". On casting Anupam Tripathi as Ali Abdul, Hwang said, "It was hard to find good foreign actors in Korea." He chose Anupam Tripathi because of his emotional acting capabilities and fluency in Korean. Both Gong Yoo and Lee Byung Hun had worked with Hwang during his previous films, Silenced and The Fortress respectively, and Hwang had asked both to appear in small roles within Squid Game. The VIPs were selected from non-Korean actors living in Asia; in the case of Geoffrey Giuliano, who played the VIP that interacted with Jun-ho, his prior role from Train to Busan Presents: Peninsula led to his casting for Squid Game.

Casting for the series was confirmed on June 17, 2020.

Costume, set design, and filming

Production and filming of the series ran from June to October 2020, including a mandatory month break due to the ongoing COVID-19 pandemic. City scenes were filmed in Daejeon, while the island setpieces were filmed on Seongapdo located in Ongjin. As Netflix was targeting the work for a global audience, the visuals were emphasized and some of the rules of the children's games were simplified to avoid potential issues with the language barrier. The colorful sets and costumes were designed to look like a fantasy world. The players and soldiers each wear a distinctive color, to reduce the sense of individuality and emphasize the difference between the two groups. The green tracksuits worn by the players were inspired by 1970s athletic wear, known as trainingbok. The maze-like corridors and stairs drew inspiration from the 4-dimensional stair drawings of M. C. Escher including Relativity. Production designer Chae Kyoung-sun said these seemingly infinite stairways represented "a form of bondage for the contestants". The complex network of tunnels between the arena, the dorm, and the administrative office was inspired by ant colonies.

Chae was also inspired by the Saemaul Undong political initiative of the 1970s aimed to modernize rural Korean villages. The mint green and pink color theme throughout the show were a common theme from Korean schools in the 1970s and 1980s, and further reflected themes throughout the show, with the green-suited players to come in fear and consider around the color pink when they are exposed to this through the guards and the stairway room.

The players' dormitory was envisioned with the concept of "people who are abandoned on the road" according to Chae; this was also used in the tug-of-war game. The room was designed using white tiles and the curved opening like a vehicular tunnel. The bed and stairs initially were laid out to look like warehouse shelves, but as the episodes progressed and these furnishing used as makeshift defenses, they took the appearance of broken ladders and stairs, implying the way these players were trapped with no way out, according to Chae. The dinner scene that took place in the eighth episode was inspired by the art installation The Dinner Party by Judy Chicago. Walls of many of the areas where the games took place were painted in skies inspired by The Empire of Light series by René Magritte.

The crew spent the most time crafting the set for the Marbles game, creating a mix of realism and fakeness as to mirror the life and death nature of the games themselves. Chae stated that this set was designed as a combination of small theatrical stages, each stage representing parts of Player 001's memories. The VIP room was one of the last pieces to be designed, and Chae said that they decided on an animal-based theme for both the costumes and room for this; "The VIPs are the kind of people who take other people's lives for entertainment and treat them like game pieces on a chessboard, so I wanted to create a powerful and instinctive look for the room."

Most sets were a combination of practical sets and chroma key backgrounds. In filming, this was far enough from the ground to make the actors nervous, which contributed to the scene.

The robot doll in the first episode, "Red Light, Green Light", was inspired by Younghee, a character who appeared on the covers of Korean textbooks Chul-soo and Young-hee in the 1970s and 1980s, and her hairstyle was inspired by Hwang's daughter's. The doll singsongs, in Korean, "Mugunghwa Flower has Blossomed", referring to the hibiscus syriacus, the national flower of South Korea. The use of this familiar character was meant to juxtapose memories of childhood and unsettling fear in the players, according to Chae. Similarly, the set for the dalgona game, using giant pieces of playground equipment, were to evoke players' memories of their childhood, and was a common place where Korean children would have played dalgona with friends. The dalgona used in "The Man with the Umbrella" were made by a street vendor from Daehangno.

Throughout the series, the trio of circle, triangle, and square shapes appear frequently on the cards given to recruit players, on the guards' masks, and inside the show's title. These are shapes associated with the playing field for the children's game of Squid (Ojing-eo). They are also used to represent the hierarchy of the guards within the complex. Following from the comparison with an ant colony, the guards with circles are considered the workers, triangles as the soldiers, and squares as the managers (see also: Korean honorifics). Further, in the Korean alphabet, Hangul, the circle represents the romanized letter "O", the triangle represents part of the letter "J", and the square represents the letter "M"; together, "OJM" are the romanized initials of Ojing-eo Geim, the Korean translation of Squid Game.

Music
Jung Jae-il, who had previously composed the soundtrack for Parasite, directed and composed Squid Game score. To prevent the score from becoming boring, Jung asked the help of two other composers: Park Min-ju and Kim Sung-soo, a music director for musicals who uses the stage name "23" when working as a composer.

Two classical music pieces are also used throughout the show as part of the routine for the players: the third movement of Joseph Haydn's "Trumpet Concerto" is used to wake the players, while Johann Strauss II's "The Blue Danube" is used to indicate the start of a new game. Ludwig van Beethoven's "Fifth Symphony" is also used for background music in the VIP lounge. A cover of "Fly Me to the Moon", arranged by Jung and sung by Korean artist Joo Won Shin, was used over the "Red Light, Green Light" game of the first episode; according to Joo, Hwang wanted a contrast between the brutal killing of the players in the game and the "romantic and beautiful lyrics and melody" of the song, such that the scene "embodies the increasingly polarized capitalist society that we live in today in a very compressed and cynical way".

For the song "Way Back Then" that accompanies children playing Squid Game, Jung wanted to use instruments that he practiced in elementary school, such as recorders and castanets. The rhythm of the song is based on a 3-3-7 clapping rhythm that is commonly used in South Korea to cheer someone on. The recorder, played by Jung himself, had a slight "beep", which was unintentional. The song "Round VI" was played by the Budapest Scoring Orchestra.

The soundtrack was released on September 17, 2021.

Marketing

In the Philippines, a replica of the doll used in the episode one of the series was exhibited on Ortigas Avenue in Quezon City in September 2021.

A Squid Game doll was installed in Olympic Park, Seoul on October 25, 2021. A replica of Squid Game's set was exhibited at the Itaewon station in Seoul since September 5, 2021. However, the exhibit was prematurely closed due to COVID-19 quarantine regulation concerns.

A Squid Game pop-up store opened in Paris on October 2 and 3, and a person could win a free one-month Netflix subscription if they managed to get the right shape from the dalgona in one minute and 30 seconds.

In the Netherlands, Netflix hosted its own Squid Game where people were able to play the game Red Light, Green Light in both Maastricht and Rotterdam. A replica of the doll was exhibited and staff were dressed as guards. Winners were awarded with Squid Game memorabilia. The event attracted hundreds of people. Similar events featuring replicas of the doll have occurred across the world, including Sydney and the United Kingdom.

In October 2021, the Hollywood Reporter interviewed Netflix Asia's executive Kim Minyoung, who said that the company was looking into a possible video game adaptation of the series.

Netflix has licensed Squid Game for merchandising. A Young-hee vinyl figure was released in January 2022. Funko released a set of Squid Game themed Funko Pop! figurines in May 2022.

Reception

Critical reception
The show received critical acclaim. On the review aggregator Rotten Tomatoes, the series has an approval rating of 95% based on 74 reviews, with an average rating of 8.10/10. The website's critics consensus reads: "Squid Games unflinching brutality is not for the faint of heart, but sharp social commentary and a surprisingly tender core will keep viewers glued to the screen – even if it's while watching between their fingers." On Metacritic, the series has a weighted average score of 69 out of 100 based on 13 critics, indicating "generally favorable reviews".

Joel Keller of Decider opined that the concept of the show was creative. When writing about the narrative, he described it as "a tight narrative and a story that has the potential to be tense and exciting". Keller concluded, "STREAM IT. Squid Game takes a fresh idea and spins it into a thrilling drama; we hope it continues to build the tension we saw in the last 20 minutes throughout the season." Pierce Conran of the South China Morning Post rated the series with 4.5 out of 5 stars and wrote, "Overall, this is still a savagely entertaining slam dunk from Netflix Korea, which is likely to be embraced around the world as its predecessors were." Hidzir Junaini of NME rated the series with 4 out of 5 stars and opined, "Thematic intelligence aside, Squid Game is also a white-knuckle watch, thanks to its visceral competition element." John Doyle of The Globe and Mail described the series as "a brave, dark, ambitious tale, at times moving and at times terrifying" and added, "Its power is in its understanding that money is survival. This is not some dystopian fantasy like Hunger Games. This is present-day life in all its complex awfulness."

Karl Quinn of The Age described the series as "enormously derivative", but wrote: "there are two tensions that elevate Squid Game. One is within the narrative, where the primacy of the individual is in direct combat with the notion of community, and where the illusion of "choice" justifies all manner of exploitation." S. Poorvaja of The Hindu wrote that "the nine episodes manage to leave its viewers horrified, yet invested in the show, thanks to the razor-sharp writing and compelling performances by its ensemble cast". Abha Shah of the Evening Standard wrote that the series was "tightly written, each episode packed with enough pace to make it truly binge worthy", and praised its themes as being "universally engaging". Hugo Rifkind of The Times described parts of the series as being "glacially slow", but stated that it was "definitely interesting", and wrote: "Behind it all, there's an almost Lovecraftian sense of horror, to do with normal lives being unliveable, and huge, unknowable powers in the background that will smirk while you die."

Writing for The New York Times, TV critic Mike Hale found Squid Game to be an "utterly traditional, and thoroughly predictable... melodrama" with "eye-catching" but "not especially interesting... production design and costuming". He also thought the series' "pretense of contemporary social relevance" failed to justify its "more than mildly sickening" violence, and thought its characters were "shallow assemblages of family and typical battlefield". Daniel D'Addario of Variety wrote: "Like Joker, there's a having-it-both-ways insistence that a culture that could create violence is inherently sick and deranged, while playing out a wildly overstated version of sick derangement in a manner designed to be maximally tense and amusing."

Due to the popularity of Squid Game, Singapore's national newspaper The Straits Times named the show's director Hwang as The Straits Times Asian of the Year in December 2021.

Viewership
The series became the first Korean drama to top Netflix's top ten weekly most-watched TV show charts globally. It reached number one in 94 countries, including the United States and the United Kingdom. Netflix estimated that Squid Game had drawn over 111 million member households worldwide after 17 days of availability, and over 142 million member households after 28 days, surpassing the 82 million that Bridgerton had received in its first 28 days in December 2020, and becoming the service's most-watched series at its launch.  After Netflix revamped its published metrics of viewership in November 2021 based on total hours watched of the series, Squid Game remained the most-watched show on the service, with over 1.65 billion hours within its first 28 days compared to Bridgerton 625 million hours. Although Netflix is not available in mainland China, pirated versions of Squid Game have been widely circulated on the Chinese Internet, making the show a popular topic on Chinese social networking sites. As of July 2022, Squid Game remained the most-watched show on Netflix based on the first 28 days of viewing, ahead of Stranger Things 4.

Outside of Asian regions, its popularity was driven primarily through word of mouth and viral spread on social media. Vulture also claimed that the show's widespread localization, with subtitles in 37 languages and dubbed versions in 34 languages, helped to capture an international audience. Hwang believed that the popularity was due "by the irony that hopeless grownups risk their lives to win a kids' game", as well as the familiarity and simplicity of the games that allowed the show to focus on characterization. The diversity of the characters that play the Squid Game, drawing from different walks of lower- and middle-class life, also helps draw audiences to watch as many could find sympathy in one or more of the characters.

Squid Game had not broken into the Nielsen ratings for streaming media on its first week of availability, but for the week of September 20 through 26, 2021, it was the most-viewed show on streaming services in the United States, with over 1.9 billion minutes watched. It remained the top-viewed program on streaming media from September 27 to October 3, 2021, reaching over 3.26 billion minutes watched in the U.S. These ratings made it the most-viewed streaming program to date in 2021, and the sixth such program to reach over 3 billion minutes watched in a single week since the introduction of Nielsen's streaming media ratings.  This is the only record achieved in a single season without COVID-19 lockdowns. Squid Game remained the most-watched show according to Nielsen for the weeks starting October 4 and 11, 2021, but was ousted by You in the following week. For four consecutive weeks, Squid Game remained as the most watched series on TV tracking service TV Time, where it also became the most followed Korean series to date. On YouTube, Squid Game related content generated  views within eight weeks, the highest for a television show, surpassing the viewership generated by Game of Thrones related content in ten years. Nielsen reported that Squid Game was the second-most watched original series in the United States on streaming services for all of 2021, following Lucifer.

Due to Squid Game surprising success for Netflix, operators of other streaming services with original content, such as Disney+, Paramount+ and Apple TV+, have begun looking to follow Netflix's model of discovering regional content beyond Hollywood and finding similarly successful works for their platforms, with one executive calling this an area of "unlimited potential". Besides bringing new ideas and veering from common themes of typical Hollywood productions, such foreign productions are typically less expensive to make, with tax breaks or incentives by the host country for filming and production. Several producers of non-US TV series, who had little luck in pitching their shows to US-based streaming services in the past, were hopeful that these services would now seriously consider their works as a result of Squid Game success.

Accolades 

O Yeong-su's Golden Globe win made him the first Korean-born actor to win the award. The show's four SAG Award nominations also made history in it becoming the first non-English series and first Korean series to be nominated for Outstanding Performance by an Ensemble in a Drama Series. Individually, Lee Jung-jae became the first male actor from Asia and Korea to receive an individual SAG Award nomination and HoYeon Jung became the second actress of Asian as well as Korean descent to do the same. With both performers winning, the show made history in becoming the first non-English language television series to win at the SAG Awards. The show also received 14 nominations for the Primetime Emmy Awards, including for Best Drama, making it the first non-English show to be nominated in this category.

Public response and impact

Squid Game was considered one of the latest examples of the Korean wave, the growing trend of popular South Korean media to gain international attention since the late 2010s, similar to popular Korean pop bands like BTS and Korean dramas and films like Parasite. Such works had drawn more attention due to streaming services like Netflix and YouTube making South Korean content, traditionally controlled by the country's national broadcasters, available across the globe. Further, according to Choe Sang-Hun of The New York Times, South Korean creators have a way of taking ideas from foreign works and applying their own cultural spin on it that draws in more audiences.

While all of the actors saw increases in followers on their social media accounts in the weeks after Squid Game premiered, HoYeon Jung saw one of the largest increases, going from about 400,000 to over 13 million followers in three weeks after Squid Game premiered, and reaching over 23.5 million by November 2021. In October 2021, the fashion brand Louis Vuitton announced Jung as their new global ambassador for fashion, watches, and jewelry; creative director Nicolas Ghesquière said he "immediately fell in love with Jung's great talent and fantastic personality" from her performance on Squid Game. O Yeong-su, who had a modest career in Korean theater and film prior to Squid Game, was surprised by his newfound fame following the show, making him feel like he was "floating on air". Lacking a casting agent, he had to turn to help from his daughter to handle the volume of calls asking him to appear in various roles. Several major talent agencies sought to sign Hwang and the lead actors of Squid Game in the months after its debut, with Jung being the first to sign on with Creative Artists Agency by mid-November 2021.

In South Korea, the popularity of Squid Game led to a surge of network traffic which caused SK Broadband to file a lawsuit against Netflix, seeking monetary damages to pay for increased broadband usage and maintenance costs associated with the program. One of the phone numbers used in the show belonged to a private resident who reported receiving up to 4,000 calls each day from people, several of whom desired to play a real-life version of the game; Netflix stated they would edit the show to remove the number.

Vendors of dalgona, the honeycomb candy featured in the second game, both within Korea and internationally found a significant increase in sales after the show's release. Everyday clothing items matching those worn in the show saw large growths in sales in the weeks after the show's initial broadcast, such as Vans slip-on shoes which spiked by 7,800%. Variety attributed this sales increase in part to preparation for Halloween costumes inspired by the show. Vendors of other costume props that mirrored those in the show, such as the guards' masks, also saw sales spikes in advance of Halloween following the show's premiere. The garment industry in South Korea saw a brief resurgence as demand for green tracksuits based on the show grew.

Netflix claimed that Squid Game had "pierced the cultural zeitgeist" and became a popular Internet meme, with over 42 billion views of videos related to Squid Game in the first month after broadcast. Analytics firm Vobile stated that by November 2021, views of Squid Game-related videos on YouTube had surpassed 17 billion views, surpassing that for Game of Thrones. On October 16, 2021, an episode of the American late-night live television sketch comedy and variety show Saturday Night Live, featuring guest host Rami Malek and cast member Pete Davidson, parodied Squid Game by singing a country song about the series. As of November 5, 2021, the song has over 9.6 million views on Saturday Night Live's YouTube channel. In November 2021, American YouTuber Jimmy Donaldson aka MrBeast recreated Squid Game in real life with 456 people competing in similar but non-lethal games as the show for a $456,000 cash prize. The video drew more than 303.5 million views as of November 15, 2022, making it one of the most-watched YouTube videos of 2021. Series creator Hwang has reacted positively to the recreations and parodies. Google reported that Squid Game was the most-searched television show on search engine in 2021, while Twitter said that Squid Game was the most-tweeted about television show of 2021.

Shortly after the show's release, users of social media adapted some of the games featured in Squid Game as Internet challenges, including the first "Red Light, Green Light" game and the second honeycomb cookie game. Users of video games supporting user-created content, such as Roblox, Fortnite Creative, and Grand Theft Auto Online, created numerous games within these systems that were based on one or more of the Squid Game challenges. A video game named Crab Game was also created in response to Squid Game popularity. Some groups also worked to organize safe, mock Squid Game events for fans of the show. Concerns have been raised about children's exposure to Squid Game from either watching it or through its viral popularity, as it is considered to have a high level of violence for that age group. A number of schools around the United Kingdom observed that despite the show being aimed at mature audiences, young children were emulating some of the games from Squid Game during school recess, and warned parents about these activities. Parents and school boards in Quebec, Canada and in the Fayetteville-Manlius Central School District of New York have also observed young children emulating games from Squid Game and taken steps such as warning parents and banning such activities from school grounds.

Chinese online video platform Youku announced plans in October 2021 to launch the show Squid Victory (鱿鱼的胜利, Yóuyú de Shènglì) in 2022. The upcoming show, initially named Victory of Squid, was heavily criticized by Chinese netizens after it was discovered that it had plagiarized the plot and themes of Squid Game. After facing criticism, the company apologized and stated that the show's poster and the title were abandoned. Youku later shared a new poster and announced that the show's name has been changed to Game's Victory.

Squid Game has been accused of plagiarizing the 2014 Japanese movie As the Gods Will, as both involve children's games where the penalty for losing is death. However, writer-director Hwang Dong-hyuk claimed he wrote Squid Game's script in 2009 (5 years before As the Gods Will was released), saying "the similarities that were pointed out are purely coincidental and there is no copying from either party".

The show was used as the basis for an unaffiliated short-lived cryptocurrency scam named SQUID which had started trading in late October 2021. The currency was poised to be used eventually to back a site for online games where player would buy tokens to play in games inspired by Squid Game, with those buying the currency helping to support the investment of the site, with the currency's value to increase as more players used the site. The currency had drawn enough buyers to increase in value by over 2,300% within a day of trading, but news organizations like the BBC identified that the scheme appears to be a "rug pull" scam due to several red flags in the proposition.

YouTuber and member of the Yogscast network Lydia Ellery, who had used the handles "Squid Game" and "SquidGaming" for 11 years, was refused work because of her handle's perceived association with the show. She has also been subject to harassment by fans of Squid Game who "thought [she] took the account from the show", with some fans attempting to hack into her accounts.

Themes and analysis

Capitalism and economic disparity
Hwang wrote Squid Game based on his own personal experiences and observations of capitalism and economic class struggles within South Korea. Hwang also considered that his script was targeted towards global issues regarding capitalism, stating, "I wanted to create something that would resonate not just for Korean people but globally. This was my dream." and  "I do believe that the overall global economic order is unequal and that around 90% of the people believe that it's unfair. During the pandemic, poorer countries can't get their people vaccinated. They're contracting viruses on the streets and even dying. So I did try to convey a message about modern capitalism. As I said, it's not profound."
 
Commentators agreed that these themes applied to capitalism across the globe today. The Guardian Nemo Kim and Justin McCurry describe that the situation that many of the players in Squid Game leading to their debt reflects the reality of the South Korean personal debt crisis, which had exceeded 100% of the country's gross domestic product at the time the show first broadcast. Rising debt had led to the government placing restrictions on borrowing practices to try to prevent people from falling further in debt, but this itself had the impact of making other borrowers finding themselves unable to pay back loans without taking out higher-interest loans, creating a rapid cascading effect. Many Koreans in these situations, often named as the "dirt spoon" class, turn to risky propositions, such as high-risk investments, cryptocurrency, or gambling, anticipating a big payoff but end up further in debt and exacerbating the problem, according to The Associated Press Kim Tong-Hyung. The use of trainingbok outfits for the players was said to allude to their connotation with baeksu, roughly translated as "white hands", people that have not been able to gain financial independence and discriminated by society as they often spend their days idle and doing no work, according to Indiana University professor Jooyoung Shin.

Brian Lowry of CNN wrote that the series "presents a visually arresting variation on themes seen plenty of times before, which include tapping into the class divide – and the rich essentially preying on the poor and destitute – at a moment when the audience might be more receptive to that message". Henry Wong of The Guardian compared the show favorably to the 2019 South Korean film Parasite, and said that the show used the "present-day, very real wealth inequality" in South Korea as a backdrop to keep the viewer interested in its characters. Caitlyn Clark of American socialist magazine Jacobin also compared the series favorably to Parasite and said that it "shreds the capitalist myth that hard work guarantees prosperity". Melanie McFarland of the American liberal website Salon.com described the series as "an excellent distillation of how predatory capitalism works". E. Tammy Kim of American progressive magazine The Nation wrote: "Squid Game is not a subtle show, either in its politics or plot. Capitalism is bloody and mean and relentless; it yells." Morgan Ome of The Atlantic wrote that the series "fits into a category of South Korean works that grapple with economic anxieties and class struggles, which are rooted in the country's concerns but resonate globally", adding that it "indicts the rich for propagating a false sense of upward mobility and the poor for buying into it".

Zach Weissmueller of Reason argued against an anti-capitalist interpretation of the series, saying that "Squid Game isn't really about capitalism, properly understood. It's about developing strategies for undermining and resisting authoritarian control and retaining your humanity under a system designed to strip it all away."

As the series was introduced ahead of the 2022 South Korean presidential election, several of the candidates began using some of the Squid Game imagery in their political ads and challenging opponents to similar games, as well as using the themes of the series related to economic disparity as part of their political platform. The Korean Confederation of Trade Unions used outfits and imagery based on Squid Game as part of its messaging and demonstrations against the current economic disparity in South Korea. Closer to the election, the campaign had become drowned in more mudslinging, with the various candidates calling out others through insulting names and asserting that those that lost would be sent to jail, and as a result, the campaign period became known as the "Squid Game Campaign". A North Korean state-run website, 'Arirang Meari', used Squid Game to critically mock the economic situation in South Korea, saying that it exposes the "beastly" nature of the "South Korean capitalist society where mankind is annihilated by extreme competition", and describes South Korea as a country where "corruption and immoral scoundrels are commonplace". A diplomatic cable of the United States Department of State said, "At the heart of the show's dark story is the frustration felt by the average Korean, and particularly Korean youth, who struggle to find employment, marriage, or upward mobility—proving that grim economic prospects are indeed at the center of Korean society's woes."

Other commentary
Several journalists observed that Squid Game effectively used foreshadowing in alluding to the deaths of the major characters and other elements of the series. For example, Ali (Player 199) is shown in the second episode to be tricked by his employer out of his wages, while his death comes after he is tricked into giving Sang-woo his marbles in the sixth episode. Similarly, the gangster Deok-su (Player 101) evades a set-up by his underlings in the second episode by diving off a bridge, while his death in the game comes from the seventh episode Stepping Stones game when pulled to his death from the glass bridge by Mi-nyeo. Sae-byeok has a scar on her neck and holds a knife to the neck of the man who swindled her out of her money; later her throat is slit by Sang-woo. Several additional scenes in early episodes also were said to have hinted towards Il-nam (Player 001) being special and not just a normal player of the game, including being the only old person among the players, having the "001" player identification, and keen awareness of all the games since they were of his design.

The series drew some criticism for its similarity to the 2014 Japanese film As the Gods Will. Like the manga upon which the film was based, Squid Game features dangerous versions of children's games such as Daruma-san ga koronda, the Japanese version of Red Light, Green Light. Responding to allegations of plagiarism, director Hwang Dong-hyuk stated that he had been working on the script since at least 2008 and that similarities between the two films, of which he had been made aware during the process of filming, were coincidental. He acknowledged that he had been inspired by Japanese comics and animation, including Battle Royale and Liar Game.

Some bilingual viewers have debated the quality of Netflix's translations, observing that the English closed captioning, which was based on the English dub, changed the meaning of some dialogue when compared to the original Korean. Bilingual performers for the English dub acknowledged that there were some translation issues, and noted that this type of work is challenging due to limitations on how captioning can be presented to viewers. Jinhyun Cho, a senior lecturer in translation at Macquarie University, stated that particularly in the Korean language, there are words that are "untranslatable" such as aegyo, as well as honorifics used in Korean culture. Because on-screen translations are limited to a small space, there is no room for translators to provide the necessary context for these words, and thus they are often left out or overly simplified, frequently so in the case of Squid Game. Cho gave the example of Sang-woo asking Ali to call him hyung, a Korean honorific term used to refer to one as an older brother or an older trusted friend, rather than the more formal sajang-nim (company president) that Ali had been using since they first met. However, due to the complexities of the meaning of hyung, the English translation simplified "Call me hyung" to just "call me Sang-woo", losing the implication of this request. The quality of the subtitles of Squid Game opened debate about Netflix, and other services looking to expand their libraries with international works, to give more effort to the subtitles and closed captioning quality in order to better capture meaning of the original language.

The show received some criticism for its portrayal of women. Haeil, a feminist organisation in Korea, said that the show was "neither a representation nor a criticism of the reality of anti-feminism in Korea" and that it demonstrated an "exclusively male gaze". The show was also found to highlight how migrant workers from other Asian countries (in the case of Ali's character being from Pakistan) are treated and at times exploited as second-class citizens within South Korea, though some found Ali's character to be too naïve to the realities of the situation and a caricature of such migrant workers within the country.

Sequels and related works

Sequels
Due to the stress of writing and producing the first series of nine episodes himself, Hwang initially had no immediate plans to write a sequel to Squid Game. He did not have well-developed plans for a follow-up story and said that if he were to write one, he would likely need a staff of writers and directors to help him. With the immense popularity of the show, Hwang later opined about the possibility of a second season, telling CNN "There's nothing confirmed at the moment, but so many people are enthusiastic that I'm really contemplating it." Hwang said in an interview with The Times that a second season may focus more on the story of the Front Man as well as incorporating more about the police. Hwang said, "I think the issue with police officers is not just an issue in Korea. I see it on the global news that the police force can be very late in acting on things—there are more victims or a situation gets worse because of them not acting fast enough. This was an issue that I wanted to raise." He added he also wanted to explore the relationship between the cryptic Front Man and his policeman brother Hwang Jun-ho, as well as the background of the salesman character (portrayed by Gong Yoo).

In late October 2021, Hwang stated he was in discussions with Netflix regarding a sequel; he further stated he and Netflix were also in discussions for a third season in December 2021. Hwang wanted to produce another film first as well as looking to secure a contract with Netflix to show additional films he may create alongside any further Squid Game seasons, as to avoid becoming known only for being the Squid Game creator. Hwang confirmed that he had begun conceptualization work on a second season during a press event in November 2021, with plans to bring back Lee Jung-jae to reprise his role of Gi-hun. Netflix stated in response to Hwang's comments that they had not yet officially greenlit a second season, but were in discussions with Hwang towards one. During an earnings call in January 2022, Netflix's Sarandos said when asked about a second season "Absolutely...the Squid Game universe has just begun." Hwang said in April 2022 that he presently was working on Killing Old People Club, an adaption of a work called "Pape Satan Aleppe: Chronicles of a Liquid Society by Umberto Eco (Korean: 미친 세상을 이해하는 척하는 방법; "The way to pretend to understand the crazy world"), and anticipated that the second season of Squid Game would be completed and broadcast by 2024.  Netflix confirmed that the second season was greenlit in June 2022. Hwang confirmed that the characters of Gi-hun and the Front Man will return for the second season, and will introduce Cheol-su, Young-hee's boyfriend. Hwang said that he would like to bring back some of the dead characters, such as Ji-young, and expressed regret that he had killed off several beloved characters since he did not have any plans for a second season at that time.

Mockumentary
Hwang also had worked with Netflix to create a mockumentary inspired by Squid Game success, currently titled The Best Show on the Planet. Hwang said the comedy was based on his own personal experience of being pushed into the spotlight due to the rapid success of Squid Game.

Reality show

Netflix announced a reality competition series, Squid Game: The Challenge, in June 2022 along with an open casting call. The ten-episode series will see 456 players competing for a  cash prize, with challenges based on those in the show. Production is a joint work of Studio Lambert and The Garden. The filming started in early 2023 at Cardington Studios in Bedfordshire.

In January 2023, reports emerged that ambulances had been called to treat real life injuries sustained while filming the show. Netflix denied the severity of the reports stating that the injuries were mild medical conditions and that they care about the health and safety of the cast and crew. The local ambulance service also stated that it had not been called out to the studios recently. Britain's Health and Safety Executive evaluated the production after these complaints and found no actionable issues, though cautioned the production to be prepared for any future risks.

See also
 Battle royal

Notes

References

External links
 
 
 Squid Game at Rotten Tomatoes
 
 Squid Game at Daum 

 
2021 South Korean television series debuts
Battle royale
Criticism of capitalism
2022 web series debuts
South Korean drama web series
Korean-language Netflix original programming
South Korean action television series
South Korean horror fiction television series
South Korean thriller television series
Television productions suspended due to the COVID-19 pandemic
Television series set on fictional islands
Television shows about death games
Television shows set in Seoul
2020s fads and trends
Grand Prize Paeksang Arts Award (television) winners